The Natural is a 1952 novel about baseball by Bernard Malamud, and is his debut novel. The story follows Roy Hobbs, a baseball prodigy whose career is sidetracked after being shot by a woman whose motivation remains mysterious. The story mostly concerns his attempts to return to baseball later in life, when he plays for the fictional New York Knights with his self-made bat "Wonderboy".

Based upon the bizarre shooting incident and subsequent comeback of Philadelphia Phillies player Eddie Waitkus, the story of Roy Hobbs takes some poetic license and embellishes what was truly a strange, but memorable, account of a career lost too soon. Apart from the fact that both Waitkus and fictional Hobbs were shot by women, there are few if any other similarities.  It has been alternately suggested by historian Thomas Wolf that the shooting incident might have been inspired by Chicago Cubs shortstop Billy Jurges, who was shot by a showgirl with whom he was romantically linked, but there has been no evidence to support this claim.

A film adaptation, The Natural, starring Robert Redford as Roy Hobbs, was released in 1984.

Plot

Nineteen-year-old Roy Hobbs is traveling by train to Chicago with his manager Sam to try out for the Chicago Cubs. Other passengers include sportswriter Max Mercy, Walter "The Whammer" Whambold, the leading hitter in the American League and three-time American League Most Valuable Player (based on Babe Ruth), and Harriet Bird, a beautiful but mysterious woman. The train makes a quick stop at a carnival along the rail where The Whammer challenges Hobbs to strike him out. Hobbs does just that, much to everyone's surprise and The Whammer's humiliation. Back on the train Harriet Bird strikes up a conversation with Hobbs, who never suspects that Bird has any ulterior motive. In fact, she is a lunatic obsessed with shooting the best baseball player. Her intended target was Whammer, but after Hobbs struck him out, her attention shifts to Hobbs.

In Chicago, Hobbs checks into his hotel and promptly receives a call from Bird, who is also staying there. When he goes down to her room, she shoots him in the stomach.

The novel picks up 16 years later in the dugout of the New York Knights, a fictional National League baseball team. The team has been on an extended losing streak, and manager Pop Fisher's and assistant manager Red Blow's careers appear to be winding to an ignominious end. During one losing game, Roy Hobbs emerges from the clubhouse tunnel and announces that he is the team's new right fielder, having just been signed by Knights co-owner Judge Banner. Both Pop and Red take Hobbs under their wing, and Red later tells Hobbs about Fisher's plight as manager of the Knights. The Judge wants to take over Pop's share in the team but cannot do that until the current season ends and provided the Knights fail to win the National League pennant.

Being the newest player, Roy has a number of practical jokes played upon him, including the theft of his "Wonderboy" bat. Once Roy gets his first chance at the plate, however, he proves to be a true "natural" at the game. During one game, Pop substitutes Hobbs as a pinch hitter for team star Bump Bailey, intending to teach Bailey a lesson for not hustling. Pop tells Roy to "knock the cover off of the ball". Roy literally does that — hitting a triple to right field. A few days later, a newly hustling Bump attempts to play a hard hit fly ball. He runs into the outfield wall, later dying from the impact. Roy permanently takes over Bump's position.

Max Mercy reappears, searching for details of Hobbs' past. Hobbs remains quiet even after Mercy offers five thousand dollars, telling him, "All the public is entitled to is my best game of baseball." At the same time, Hobbs has been attempting to negotiate a higher salary with the judge, arguing that his success should be rewarded. Mercy introduces Hobbs to bookie Gus Sands, who is keeping company with Memo Paris, Pop's niece. Hobbs has been infatuated with Memo since he came to the Knights. Hobbs' magic tricks appear to impress her.

Max Mercy writes a column about the judge's refusal to grant Hobbs a raise, and a fan uprising ensues. Hobbs, however, is more occupied with Memo. Pop warns Hobbs about Memo, saying she imparts bad luck on the people she associates with. Hobbs dismisses the warning and promptly falls into a hitting slump. Numerous attempts to reverse it fail. He finally hits a home run during a game where a mysterious woman rises from her seat. Before Hobbs can see who she is, she has left. Roy eventually meets the woman. Her name is Iris Lemon, and he proceeds to court her. Upon learning she is a mother, however, he loses interest and returns his attention to Memo Paris.

Memo rebuffs Roy's advances; Hobbs continues to play brilliantly and leads the Knights to a 17-game winning streak. With the Knights one game away from winning the National League pennant, Roy attends a party hosted by Memo. He collapses there and awakens in the hospital. The doctor says he can play in the final game of the season, but must retire after that if he wants to live. Hobbs wants to start a family with Memo and realizes he will need money.

The judge offers Hobbs a bribe to lose the Knight's final game. Hobbs makes a counter-offer of $35,000, which is accepted. That night, unable to sleep, he reads a letter from Iris. After seeing the word "mother" in the letter, he discards it. He plays the next day and while at-bat, fouls a pitch into the stands that strikes Iris, injuring her and splits the Wonderboy bat in two lengthwise. Iris tells Roy that she is pregnant with his child, and now he is determined to do his best for their future. At the end of the game, with a chance to win it, Hobbs, now trying to win, comes to bat against Herman Youngberry, a brilliant young pitcher similar to Hobbs at the same age. Youngberry strikes out Hobbs, ending the game and the season for the Knights. As he sits bemoaning the end of the season and possibly his career, Mercy rediscovers the shooting and also finds out that Hobbs was paid to throw the game. If this report from Mercy is true, Roy Hobbs will be expelled from the game and all of his records removed.

Major characters

Roy Hobbs – "The Natural" – A former teenage pitching phenomenon whose career dreams were derailed after a mysterious woman shot and seriously wounded him as he travelled to Chicago to try out for a Major League baseball team. The story revolves around Hobbs's quest to make a comeback years after the tragedy and, hopefully, finally to take his rightful place on the field and be remembered as one of the greatest ballplayers of all time.
Memo Paris – Roy's main love interest throughout the story, Memo is Pop Fisher's niece and is often in the company of  Sands. She is generally unhappy and leads Roy on for most of the novel.
Pop Fisher – The grizzled manager of the New York Knights, Pop was once a fine player who is remembered for making a crucial error in his playing career and for never winning the big game. His name and situation are suggestive of the Fisher King of legend.
Max Mercy – A seedy journalist who is more concerned with unearthing facts about the players' personal lives than covering the sport itself. Mercy meets Hobbs in the beginning of the novel and later spends most of his time trying to uncover his dark secrets.
 Sands – A morally bankrupt bookie who enjoys placing bets against Hobbs until he persuades him to take a dive in the final game. He is also always around Memo, despite Roy's protests.
Iris Lemon – A fan of Roy's who helps him break his slump in the middle of the season. Iris makes a deep connection with Roy, although he favors Memo over her until the end of the novel.
Harriet Bird – The mysterious woman the teen-aged Roy meets on the train when he is en route to Chicago at the beginning of the novel. She later shoots him in her hotel room before committing suicide. Her character is loosely based on Ruth Ann Steinhagen, a disturbed 19-year-old baseball fan who, obsessed with Eddie Waitkus, shot and nearly killed him in 1949.

References

External links

1952 American novels
American novels adapted into films
Baseball novels
Harcourt (publisher) books
Novels by Bernard Malamud
1952 debut novels